Markus Ibrahim is an Anglican bishop in Nigeria.

He has been Bishop of Yola in the Province of Jos since 2005.

He became Archbishop of Jos in 2020.

Notes

Living people
Anglican bishops of Yola
21st-century Anglican archbishops
21st-century Anglican bishops in Nigeria
Year of birth missing (living people)
Anglican archbishops of Jos